Bontia daphnoides, commonly known as wild olive or white alling, is the only species of the flowering plant genus Bontia in the family Scrophulariaceae. It is a shrub or small tree growing on many Caribbean islands both as a wild plant and cultivated in gardens.

Description 
The bark is light brown, thick and grooved. They are crowded on the ends of the branches and have many small oil glands.

The tube has two lobes of different sizes and the lower one is rolled back and covered on its upper surface with a dense layer of purple hairs. The tube is yellowish-brown and covered with many raised oil glands on the outside. Flowers are present for most of the year and are followed by fruits which are roughly spherical with a small beak, pale yellow at first but drying to brown.

Taxonomy and naming
Bontia daphnoides was first formally described in 1753 by Carl Linnaeus and the description was published in Species Plantarum. The specific epithet (daphnoides) possibly refers to the similarity of this species to plants in the genus Daphne. The species has many common names depending on the language spoken on the island where it is found. The name white alling is used in the Virgin Islands and wild olive in Barbados. Other names include olivier bord de mer (Martinique), mang blanc (Haiti), mangle (Puerto Rico) and aceituna americana (Cuba).

Distribution and habitat
Bontia daphnoides occurs on most of the islands in the Caribbean and on the coasts of Venezuela and Guyana. It is naturalised in Florida. It grows it coastal areas, often near mangroves where it is often the dominant plant.

Use in horticulture
White alling is grown as a hedge or as a feature plant, especially in areas exposed to salt spray and are common in places like the coasts of Guyana. There are also grown in the high Andes of Venezuela and often occur as garden escapees.

References 

Scrophulariaceae
Flora of the Caribbean
Flora of Guyana
Flora of Venezuela
Monotypic Lamiales genera
Scrophulariaceae genera